Paul "The Sting" Slowinski (born 24 September 1980) is a Polish kickboxer, a four-time World Muay Thai Council (WMC) Muay Thai World champion and two-time K-1 World GP 2006 in Auckland and K-1 World GP 2007 in Amsterdam champion. After two years training in Amsterdam, Netherlands under Ernesto Hoost, Slowinski moved back to Adelaide in 2009 and began to teach and train out of Rikers Gym. He has competed in the K-1 and SUPERKOMBAT promotions.

Biography
Paul Slowinski was born in Strzegom, Poland and immigrated to Adelaide, Australia in 1996 as a teenager with his mother and brother. He started kickboxing in 1998 under Alan Wong. He turned pro in February 2001.

He faced Cătălin Moroşanu at the K-1 World Grand Prix 2012 in Tokyo Final 16 on 14 October 2012 and lost via unanimous decision after visiting the canvas twice in round three.

He defeated Nato Lauui via unanimous decision at Kings of Kombat 8 in Melbourne on 8 December 2012.

Slowinski and Ben Edwards met for the fourth time on 23 March 2013 in Canberra, Australia at Capital Punishment 7. Edwards won on points to bring their rivalry to 2–2.

He made his professional MMA debut against Leamy Tato at MMA Downunder 4, on 21 September 2013. The event was held at the Adelaide Arena in Adelaide, South Australia. He spend time training for this bout with the Blackzilians training camp in Boca Raton, Florida.

He lost to Raul Cătinaș by third-round KO at the SUPERKOMBAT World Grand Prix 2013 Final in Galați, Romania on 21 December 2013.

Slowinski defeated Tsotne Rogava via unanimous decision to win the WMC World Super Heavyweight (+95 kg/209 lb) Championship at Monte Carlo Fighting Masters 2014 in Monte Carlo, Monaco on 14 June 2014.

Titles
 2014 WMC Super Heavyweight World champion
 2011 ISKA Heavyweight World champion
 2010 K-1 Oceania GP in Canberra runner up
 2009 International Kickboxer Magazine Super Heavyweight(+95 kg) champion
 2009 WMC Super Heavyweight World champion
 2008 WMC Super Heavyweight World champion
 2007 WMC Super Heavyweight World champion
 2007 K-1 World GP in Amsterdam champion
 2006 K-1 World Grand Prix in Auckland champion
 2005 KOMA GP in Tokyo champion
 2005 WMC World Heavyweight GP champion
 2005 King of Oceania champion
 2003 WMC Heavyweight World champion
 2002 WMC Cruiserweight World champion
 2001 WMC Light Heavyweight World champion
 2001 Super 8 Tournament in Brisbane champion
 1999 IAMTF Australian Super Light Heavyweight champion
 1999 King's Birthday Cup Amateur champion

Kickboxing record

|-  style="background:#fbb;"
| 2015-12-26 || Loss ||align=left|  Zabit Samedov || Akhmat Fight Show || Grozny, Russia || Decision (Unanimous) || 3 || 3:00 
|-  style="background:#cfc;"
| 2014-06-14 || Win ||align=left| Tsotne Rogava || Monte Carlo Fighting Masters 2014 || Monte Carlo, Monaco || Decision (Unanimous) || 5 || 3:00
|-
! style=background:white colspan=9 |
|-  style="background:#fbb;"
| 2013-12-21 || Loss ||align=left| Raul Cătinaș || SUPERKOMBAT World Grand Prix 2013 Final || Galați, Romania || KO (Left Uppercut) || 3 || 2:32
|-  style="background:#cfc;"
| 2013-12-04 || Win ||align=left| Cihad Kepenek || A1 World Grand Prix 2013 || Melbourne || TKO || 1 || 
|-  style="background:#fbb;"
| 2013-03-23 || Loss ||align=left| Ben Edwards || Capital Punishment 7 || Canberra, Australia || Decision || 3 || 3:00
|-  style="background:#cfc;"
| 2012-12-08 || Win ||align=left| Nato Lauui || Kings of Kombat 8 || Australia || Decision (unanimous) || 3 || 3:00
|-  style="background:#cfc;"
| 2012-11-17 || Win ||align=left| Antz Nansen || Knees of Fury 39 || Adelaide, Australia || KO (kick to the body) || 2 || 
|-  style="background:#fbb;"
| 2012-10-14 ||Loss ||align=left| Cătălin Moroşanu || K-1 World Grand Prix 2012 in Tokyo Final 16, First Round || Tokyo, Japan || Decision (unanimous) || 3 || 3:00
|-  style="background:#cfc;"
| 2012-08-25 || Win ||align=left| Doug Viney || Capital Punishment 6 || Canberra, Australia || Decision || 3 || 3:00
|-  style="background:#cfc;"
| 2012-02-25 || Win ||align=left| Steve Banks || Knees of Fury 36 || Mile End, South Australia || TKO (Leg Kicks) || 3 || 
|-  style="background:#cfc;"
| 2011-11-26 || Win ||align=left| Chris Knowles || Knees of Fury 35 || Mile End, South Australia || TKO (Leg Kicks) || 1 || 
|-  style="background:#cfc;"
| 2011-09-16 || Win ||align=left| Steve Banks || Knees of Fury 34 || Mile End, South Australia || KO (Body Hook) || 3 || 
|-  style="background:#cfc;"
| 2011-08-20 || Win ||align=left| Peter Graham || Kings of Combat 4 || Keysborough, Australia || KO || 3 || 
|-
! style=background:white colspan=9 |
|-  style="background:#cfc;"
| 2011-02-26 || Win ||align=left| Thor Hoopman || Knees of Fury 32 || Mile End, South Australia || TKO (Punches) || 1 || 3:00
|-  style="background:#cfc;"
| 2010-12-15 || Win ||align=left| Carter Williams || Kings of Combat 2 || Melbourne || TKO || 2 || 
|-  style="background:#cfc;"
| 2010-11-13 || Win ||align=left| Andre Meunier || Knees of Fury 31 || Adelaide, Australia || KO (Left Round Kick)|| 1 || 0:33
|-  style="background:#cfc;"
| 2010-08-29 || Win ||align=left| Sio Vitale || Kings of Combat || Keysborough, Australia || TKO || 1 || 
|-  style="background:#fbb;"
| 2010-07-10 || Loss ||align=left| Ben Edwards || K-1 Oceania GP 2010, Final || Canberra, Australia || KO (Right hook) || 1 || 0:59
|-
! style=background:white colspan=9 |
|-  style="background:#cfc;"
| 2010-07-10 || Win ||align=left| Cedric Kongaika || K-1 Oceania GP 2010, Semi-final || Canberra, Australia || TKO (Left high kick) || 3 || 1:16
|-  style="background:#cfc;"
| 2010-07-10 || Win ||align=left| Sio Vitale || K-1 Oceania GP 2010, Quarter Final || Canberra, Australia || TKO (Left middle kick) || 1 || 2:52
|-  style="background:#fbb;"
| 2010-06-09 || Loss ||align=left| Steve McKinnon || Last Man Standing 2 Tournament, Semi-final || Melbourne || Decision (Majority) || 3 || 3:00
|-  style="background:#cfc;"
| 2010-06-09 || Win ||align=left| Eric Nosa || Last Man Standing 2 Tournament, Reserve Fight || Melbourne || KO (Left high kick) || 1 || 1:23
|-  style="background:#cfc;"
| 2010-03-28 || Win ||align=left| Konstantin Gluhov || K-1 World Grand Prix 2010 in Warsaw, Super Fight || Warsaw, Poland || KO (Right overhand) || 2 || 0:59
|-  style="background:#fbb;"
| 2010-01-09 || Loss ||align=left| Hesdy Gerges || Ring Sensation Championship: Uprising 12 || Rotterdam, Netherlands || Decision (Unanimous) || 3 || 3:00
|-  style="background:#fbb;"
| 2009-11-14 || Loss ||align=left| Thor Hoopman || Knees of Fury 27 || Mile End, South Australia || Decision (Unanimous) || 5 || 3:00
|-  style="background:#cfc;"
| 2009-10-09 || Win ||align=left| Ben Edwards || Evolution 18 || Melbourne || TKO (Low Kicks) || 3 || 
|-
! style=background:white colspan=9 |
|-  style="background:#cfc;"
| 2009-06-26 || Win ||align=left| Patrice Quarteron || Champions of Champions 2 || Montego Bay, Jamaica || KO (Left hook) || 2 || 1:55
|-
! style=background:white colspan=9 |
|-  style="background:#fbb;"
| 2008-12-06 || Loss ||align=left| Melvin Manhoef || K-1 World GP 2008 Final, Reserve Fight || Yokohama, Japan || KO (Left hook) || 1 || 2:26
|-  style="background:#cfc;"
| 2008-11-15 || Win ||align=left| Domagoj Ostojic || Angels of Fire IV Against All Odds || Plock, Poland || KO || 1 || 
|-  style="background:#fbb;"
| 2008-09-27 || Loss ||align=left| Remy Bonjasky || K-1 World GP 2008 Final 16 || Seoul, Korea || Decision (Majority)) || 3 || 3:00
|-
! style=background:white colspan=9 |
|-  style="background:#cfc;"
| 2008-08-09 || Win ||align=left| Aziz Jahjah || K-1 World GP 2008 in Hawaii || Hawaii || KO (Punches) || 3 || 1:53
|-  style="background:#cfc;"
| 2008-06-28 || Win ||align=left| Antonin Dusek || European Muaythai Championships 2008 || Zgorzelec, Poland || TKO (Doctor stoppage) || 2 || 3:00
|-
! style=background:white colspan=9 |
|-  style="background:#fbb;"
| 2008-04-26 || Loss ||align=left| Gokhan Saki || K-1 World GP 2008 in Amsterdam || Amsterdam, Netherlands || KO (Left cross) || 1 || 2:40
|-  style="background:#cfc;"
| 2007-12-08 || Win ||align=left| Mighty Mo || K-1 World Grand Prix 2007 Final, Reserve Fight || Yokohama, Japan || TKO (Low kicks) || 2 || 0:50
|-  style="background:#fbb;"
| 2007-09-29 || Loss ||align=left| Semmy Schilt || K-1 World GP 2007 in Seoul Final 16 || Seoul, Korea || KO (Knee) || 1 || 2:26
|-
! style=background:white colspan=9 |
|-  style="background:#cfc;"
| 2007-07-28 || Win ||align=left| Faisal Zakaria || Fists of Fury || Singapore || TKO (Low kick) || 4 || 0:08
|-
! style=background:white colspan=9 |
|-  style="background:#cfc;"
| 2007-06-23 || Win ||align=left| Bjorn Bregy || K-1 World Grand Prix 2007 in Amsterdam, Final || Amsterdam, Netherlands || KO (Right Hook) || 2 || 2:25
|-
! style=background:white colspan=9 |
|-  style="background:#cfc;"
| 2007-06-23 || Win ||align=left| Zabit Samedov || K-1 World Grand Prix 2007 in Amsterdam, Semi-final || Amsterdam, Netherlands || TKO (2 Knockdown) || 1 || 3:00
|-  style="background:#cfc;"
| 2007-06-23 || Win ||align=left| Hiromi Amada || K-1 World Grand Prix 2007 in Amsterdam, Quarter Final || Amsterdam, Netherlands || TKO (2 Knockdown) || 1 || 1:50
|-  style="background:#cfc;"
| 2007-06-02 || Win ||align=left| Abbas Asaraki || Fury in Macau || Macau || TKO (Low kicks) || 2 || 2:21
|-  style="background:#fbb;"
| 2006-12-02 || Loss ||align=left| Badr Hari || K-1 World Grand Prix 2006 in Tokyo Final, Super Fight || Tokyo, Japan || Decision (Unanimous) || 3 || 3:00
|-  style="background:#cfc;"
| 2006-11-11 || Win ||align=left| Xhavit Bajrami || Xplosion || Macau || Decision || 5 || 3:00
|-  style="background:#cfc;"
| 2006-05-26 || Win ||align=left| Xhavit Bajrami || || Switzerland || Decision || ||
|-  style="background:#fbb;"
| 2006-09-30 || Loss ||align=left| Glaube Feitosa || K-1 World Grand Prix 2006 in Osaka Opening Round || Osaka, Japan || Decision (Unanimous) || 3 || 3:00
|-
! style=background:white colspan=9 |
|-  style="background:#cfc;"
| 2006-07-30 || Win ||align=left| Tatsufumi Tomihira || K-1 World Grand Prix 2006 in Sapporo || Sapporo, Japan || Decision (Unanimous) || 3 || 3:00
|-  style="background:#fbb;"
| 2006-04-24 || Loss ||align=left| Alexander Ustinov || MARS World Fighting GP || Seoul, Korea || KO (Punches) || 2 || 2:55
|-  style="background:#cfc;"
| 2006-03-05 || Win ||align=left| Jason Suttie || K-1 World Grand Prix 2006 in Auckland, Final || Auckland, New Zealand || KO (Left High Kick) || 2 || 1:45
|-
! style=background:white colspan=9 |
|-  style="background:#cfc;"
| 2006-03-05 || Win ||align=left| Peter Graham || K-1 World Grand Prix 2006 in Auckland, Semi-final || Auckland, New Zealand || KO (Low Kicks) || 2 || 1:42
|-  style="background:#cfc;"
| 2006-03-05 || Win ||align=left| Rony Sefo || K-1 World Grand Prix 2006 in Auckland, Quarter Final || Auckland, New Zealand || Decision (Unanimous) || 3 || 3:00
|-  style="background:#cfc;"
| 2006-02-02 || Win ||align=left| Abdumalik Gadzhiev || Knees of Fury 12 || Adelaide, Australia || KO (Leg kicks) || 2 || 
|-  style="background:#cfc;"
| 2005-12-22 || Win ||align=left| Yuuki Niimura || KOMA GP, Final || Tokyo, Japan || KO || 2 || 
|-
! style=background:white colspan=9 |
|-  style="background:#cfc;"
| 2005-12-22 || Win ||align=left| Kanenobu || KOMA GP, Semi-final || Tokyo, Japan || KO || 2 || 
|-  style="background:#cfc;"
| 2005-12-22 || Win ||align=left| Soo Kyong || KOMA GP, Quarter Final || Tokyo, Japan || KO || 1 || 
|-  style="background:#cfc;"
| 2005-12-10 || Win ||align=left| Ben Edwards || K-1 Kings of Oceania 2005 Round 3 || Gold Coast, Australia || KO || 2 || 
|-  style="background:#fbb;"
| 2005-11-04 || Loss ||align=left| Jason Suttie || Knees of Fury 11 || Adelaide, Australia || KO (Left hook) || 3 || 
|-  style="background:#cfc;"
| 2005-10-08 || Win ||align=left| Daniel Tai || K-1 Kings of Oceania 2005 Round 2 || Auckland, New Zealand || TKO || 2 || 
|-  style="background:#cfc;"
| 2005-08-22 || Win ||align=left| Kwak Yoon Sup || Titans 2nd || Tokyo, Japan || KO (Low kicks) || 1 || 0:38
|-  style="background:#cfc;"
| 2005-07-10 || Win ||align=left| Sydney Asiata || K-1 Kings of Oceania 2005 Round 1 || Auckland, New Zealand || KO (Left hook) || 1 || 
|-  style="background:#cfc;"
| 2005-06-25 || Win ||align=left| Ryu || K-1 Challenge 2005 Xplosion X || Gold Coast, Australia || TKO (Corner Stoppage) || 2 || 3:00
|-  style="background:#cfc;"
| 2005-08-18 || Win ||align=left| Ricardo van den Bos || Knees of Fury 10 WMC World Heavyweight GP, Final || Australia || TKO (Threw in towel) || 1 || 0:05
|-
! style=background:white colspan=9 |
|-  style="background:#cfc;"
| 2005-08-18 || Win ||align=left| Roger Izonritei || Knees of Fury 10 WMC World Heavyweight GP, Semi-final || Australia || TKO (Knee strikes) || 2 || 2:30
|-  style="background:#cfc;"
| 2005-08-18 || Win ||align=left| Andrew Peck || Knees of Fury 10 WMC World Heavyweight GP, Quarter Final || Australia || KO (Right hook) || 1 || 2:00
|-  style="background:#cfc;"
| 2005-04-30 || Win ||align=left| Rony Sefo || K-1 Battle of Anzacs II || Auckland, New Zealand || Decision (Split) || 3 || 3:00
|-  style="background:#cfc;"
| 2005-03-11 || Win ||align=left| Mohammad Reza || Knees of Fury IX || Adelaide, Australia || KO (Elbows) || 2 || 
|-  style="background:#cfc;"
| 2004-12-18 || Win ||align=left| Chris Chrisopoulides || K-1 Challenge 2004 Oceania vs World || Gold Coast, Australia || Decision || 3 || 3:00
|-  style="background:#fbb;"
| 2004-11-06 || Loss ||align=left| Alexey Ignashov || Titans 1st || Kitakyushu, Japan || Decision (Unanimous) || 3 || 3:00
|-  style="background:#cfc;"
| 2004-10-15 || Win ||align=left| Matt Samoa || Knees of Fury VIII || Adelaide, Australia || KO || 2 || 
|-  style="background:#fbb;"
| 2004-09-05 || Loss ||align=left| Jorgen Kruth || SM Thaiboxing Gala || Stockholm, Sweden || Decision || 5 || 3:00
|-  style="background:#fbb;"
| 2004-07-16 || Loss ||align=left| Peter Graham || Kings of Oceania 2004, Semi-final || Auckland, New Zealand || Decision || 3 || 3:00
|-  style="background:#cfc;"
| 2004-07-16 || Win ||align=left| Sio Vitale || Kings of Oceania 2004, Quarter Final || Auckland, New Zealand || Decision || 3 || 3:00
|-  style="background:#cfc;"
| 2004-06-18 || Win ||align=left| Rony Sefo || Knees of Fury VII || Adelaide, Australia || Decision || 5 || 3:00
|-  style="background:#cfc;"
| 2004-04-23 || Win ||align=left| Andrew Peck || K-1 Battle of Anzacs 2004 || Auckland, New Zealand || KO (Right Hook) || 1 || 
|-  style="background:#cfc;"
| 2004-03-19 || Win ||align=left| Sio Vitale || Knees of Fury VI || Adelaide, Australia || TKO || 4 || 
|-  style="background:#cfc;"
| 2003-12-20 || Win ||align=left| Hyo-Phil Lee || Into the Fire 2/2 || Seoul, Korea || KO ||  || 
|-  style="background:#c5d2ea;"
| 2003-11-07 || Draw ||align=left| Chris Chrisopoulides || Knees of Fury V || Adelaide, Australia || Decision Draw || 5 || 3:00
|-  style="background:#fbb;"
| 2003-07-27 || Loss ||align=left| Mitch O'Hello || K-1 World Grand Prix 2003 in Melbourne || Melbourne || KO (Right hook) || 1 || 1:12
|-  style="background:#cfc;"
| 2003-06-15 || Win ||align=left| Jorgen Kruth || Knees of Fury IV || Adelaide, Australia || TKO (Elbow) || 1 || 
|-  style="background:#cfc;"
| 2003-04-24 || Win ||align=left| Clay Aumitagi || License 2 Thrill || Australia || TKO (Corner Stoppage) || 3 || 
|-  style="background:#cfc;"
| 2003-03-14 || Win ||align=left| Askhab Gorbakhov || WMC Heavyweight World Title || Adelaide, Australia ||  ||  || 
|-
! style=background:white colspan=9 |
|-  style="background:#cfc;"
| 2002-11-05 || Win ||align=left| Koji Iga || Shootboxing: The Age of "S" Vol.5 || Japan || TKO (Referee Stoppage) || 3 || 1:40
|-  style="background:#cfc;"
| 2002-09-21 || Win ||align=left| Daniel Paora || KB4 || Rooty Hill, Australia || TKO (Referee Stoppage) || 3 || 
|-  style="background:#cfc;"
| 2002-06-14 || Win ||align=left| Louk Thong || South Australia vs Thailand || Adelaide, Australia || TKO ||  || 
|-  style="background:#cfc;"
| 2002-05-07 || Win ||align=left| Nokweed Devy || Chaweng Stadium || Bangkok, Thailand || KO (High kick) || 4 || 
|-  style="background:#cfc;"
| 2002-04-00 || Win ||align=left| Nokweed Devy || Kanchanaburi Stadium || Bangkok, Thailand || KO (Punches) || 2 || 
|-  style="background:#cfc;"
| 2002-04-09 || Win ||align=left| Louk Thong || WMC Cruiserweight World Title, Chewang Stadium || Bangkok, Thailand || KO (Punches) || 4 || 
|-
! style=background:white colspan=9 |
|-  style="background:#cfc;"
| 2001-12-23 || Win ||align=left| Faisal Zakaria || WMC Light Heavyweight World Title || Bangkok, Thailand || TKO (Low kicks) || 3 || 
|-
! style=background:white colspan=9 |
|-  style="background:#cfc;"
| 2001-09-01 || Win ||align=left| Steve McKinnon || JNI Promotions, Star City || Australia || KO (Left Highkick) || 3 || 1:52
|-  style="background:#cfc;"
| 2001-05-12 || Win ||align=left| Nathan Corbett || Light Heavyweight Super 8, Final || Brisbane, Australia || Decision || 3 || 3:00
|-
! style=background:white colspan=9 |
|-  style="background:#cfc;"
| 2001-05-12 || Win ||align=left| Aaron Boyes || Light Heavyweight Super 8, Semi-final || Brisbane, Australia ||  ||  || 
|-  style="background:#cfc;"
| 2001-05-12 || Win ||align=left| Matt McConachy || Light Heavyweight Super 8, Quarter Final || Brisbane, Australia ||  ||  || 
|-  style="background:#cfc;"
| 2000-00-00 || Win ||align=left| John Wyborne || Thailand vs West Australia || Perth, Western Australia || KO ||  || 
|-  style="background:#cfc;"
| 1999-00-00 || Win ||align=left| Brett Dalton || Thai Consul General's Cup || Perth, Western Australia || Decision || 5 || 3:00
|-  style="background:#cfc;"
| 1998-08-14 || Win ||align=left| Liam O'Regan || South Australian Title || Adelaide, South Australia || TKO (low kicks) || 4 || 
|-
| colspan=9 | Legend:

Mixed martial arts record

|-
|Loss
|align=center| 1–2
|Michal Andryszak
|TKO (punches)
|KSW 26
|
|align=center| 1
|align=center| 1:06
|Warsaw, Poland
|
|-
|Loss
|align=center| 1–1
|Marcin Rozalski
|Submission (rear-naked choke)
|KSW 24
|
|align=center| 1
|align=center| –
|Lodz, Poland
|
|-
| Win
| align=center| 1–0
| Leamy Tato
| TKO (head kick & punches)
| MMA Downunder 4
| 
| align=center| 1
| align=center| 2:27
| Adelaide, Australia
|

See also
List of male kickboxers
List of K-1 Events

References

External links
Flinders University Muay Thai Club
Profile at K-1

1980 births
Living people
Australian male kickboxers
Polish male kickboxers
Light heavyweight kickboxers
Cruiserweight kickboxers
Heavyweight kickboxers
Australian male mixed martial artists
Australian Muay Thai practitioners
Polish male mixed martial artists
Polish Muay Thai practitioners
Polish emigrants to Australia
People from Strzegom
Sportspeople from Adelaide
Mixed martial artists utilizing Muay Thai
Mixed martial artists utilizing shootboxing
Sportspeople from Lower Silesian Voivodeship
SUPERKOMBAT kickboxers